The Embassy of the State of Palestine in Hungary is the diplomatic mission of the Palestine in Hungary. It is located in Budapest.

See also

List of diplomatic missions in Hungary.
List of diplomatic missions of Palestine.

References

Budapest
Palestine
Hungary–State of Palestine relations